A data platform usually refers to a software platform used for collecting and managing data, and acting as a data delivery point for application and reporting software.

Data platform can also refer to

Technology

Concepts and specifications 
 Customer data platform, a collection of software which creates a persistent, unified customer database that is accessible to other systems
 Data management platform, a software platform used for collecting and managing data
 Data science competition platform
 Computing platform
 Cross-platform software
 Linked Data Platform, a linked data specification defining a set of integration patterns
 Platform as a service

Specific implementations 
 Open data portal, an online platform which supports users in accessing collections of open data
 PatientBank, a medical data platform
 SimpleReach, a content data platform and performance measurement company which tracks behavior on published content

See also 
 Common data model
 Common Data Set